Jake Matthew Hyde (born 1 July 1990) is an English footballer who plays as a striker for Southend United on loan from National League club Wrexham. He has played in the English Football League for Barnet, York City and Stevenage.

Hyde started his career with Swindon Town, and after signing a professional contract in 2008 had two loan spells with Weymouth of the Conference Premier. He was released by Swindon before signing for League Two club Barnet in 2009. They released him after one season and after a spell with Conference Premier club Hayes & Yeading United, Hyde played for Scottish First Division club Dundee. He soon moved on to divisional rivals Dunfermline Athletic, but after being released returned to Dundee for the 2011–12 season. He returned to Barnet in 2012 and was their top scorer in 2012–13, although they were relegated to the Conference Premier. Hyde stayed with them for one more season before signing for League Two club York City in 2014. He was with York for two years before joining League Two club Stevenage.

Club career
Hyde was born in Maidenhead, Berkshire. He began his career at Swindon Town in their youth system, and when still a second-year scholar he signed a one-and-a-half-year professional contract with the club on 19 February 2008. During the length of his contract he had two loan spells with Weymouth in the Conference Premier. Hyde was released by Swindon in May 2009 and signed for League Two club Barnet on 2 July. He made his debut in a 1–0 away defeat to Lincoln City on 8 August 2009 and scored two goals, with a header and a penalty kick, against Shrewsbury Town a week later. Hyde's most notable contribution of the 2009–10 season came with the stoppage time winner over Notts County on 29 August 2009, having entered the match as a 90th minute substitute. Having scored a number of goals for Barnet early in the season, he was mostly used as a substitute in the second half of the season before being released in May 2010. He was named Barnet's Young Player of the Year, having scored 7 goals in 39 appearances for the club.

Hyde signed for Conference Premier club Hayes & Yeading United in October 2010 and made his debut in a 3–1 away victory over Poole Town in the FA Cup fourth qualifying round on 23 October. His first goal came in a 3–2 away defeat against Mansfield Town on 20 November 2010. Hyde was released by Hayes & Yeading in January 2011 having scored 2 goals in 12 appearances. In March 2011, he signed for Scottish junior club Lochee United, enabling him to play for Dundee of the Scottish First Division as a trialist, with Dundee unable to sign anyone via permanent transfer or loan due to their transfer embargo. Having scored on his debut in a 1–1 home draw with Dunfermline Athletic on 22 March 2011, he scored twice four days later in a 2–2 home draw, this time against Cowdenbeath. Hyde's goal against Dunfermline Athletic brought him to the attention of their manager Jim McIntyre, and he signed for them as an amateur in late March 2011 for the rest of 2010–11. After making two appearances he was released by Dunfermline in May 2011 and subsequently rejoined Dundee on 20 June on a one-year contract. He scored 6 goals in 30 appearances in 2011–12.

After a successful trial with Barnet, Hyde rejoined the League Two club on 26 July 2012. He scored the last ever goal at Underhill Stadium with an 81st-minute winner against Wycombe Wanderers in a 1–0 win on 20 April 2013. He was Barnet's top scorer with 14 goals from 42 appearances in 2012–13, which ended with the club's relegation into the Conference Premier. Hyde was named on Barnet's retained list in May 2013 with the club exercising a clause to extend his contract for another year. However, he was transfer listed at his own request the following month, with the club willing to listen to offers for him. League Two club York City expressed an interest in signing Hyde during the summer, but they were unable to meet Barnet's valuation of him after he scored four goals in the first five matches of 2013–14. He remained at the club after the transfer deadline, and despite missing much of the season through injury was Barnet's second highest scorer with 12 goals in 28 appearances, one behind Keanu Marsh-Brown with 13. He was offered a new one-year contract by Barnet, but was transfer listed again in April 2014 to attract interest in him, after expressing his desire to play in the Football League.

Hyde joined League Two club York City on 2 June 2014 on a three-year contract, with Barnet due a compensation fee. He made his debut in a 1–1 home draw with Northampton Town on 16 August 2014, and scored York's goal at the near post from an Anthony Straker corner. On 4 December 2014, Barnet were awarded £25,000 at the transfer tribunal, possibly rising to £40,000 based on appearances.

On 6 July 2016, Hyde joined League Two club Stevenage on undisclosed terms, after being released from his contract with York. On 16 February 2017, he joined National League South club Maidenhead United on a one-month loan. He was released by Stevenage at the end of 2016–17. On 26 June 2017, Hyde signed for Maidenhead permanently, following their promotion to the National League.

Hyde signed for newly relegated National League South club Woking on 16 July 2018. He made his debut on 4 August 2018 in a 1–0 win away to East Thurrock United, playing the whole match. He scored his first goal three days later, scoring an 81st-minute equalising goal in a 2–1 home victory against St Albans City.

On 14 August 2020, Hyde made the switch to fellow National League side, FC Halifax Town on a two-year deal. He scored 12 goals in 28 games for the Shaymen in the 2020-21 season.

In July 2021, Hyde joined Wrexham on a two-year deal for an undisclosed fee. On 1 August 2022, Hyde signed for fellow National League side Southend United on a season-long loan deal.

International career
Hyde was called up to the England C squad for a friendly against a Latvia under-23 team on 10 September 2013. He played the first 45 minutes of the match, which England lost 1–0.

Career statistics

Honours
Woking
National League South play-offs: 2019

Wrexham
FA Trophy runner-up: 2021–22

References

External links

Profile at the Woking F.C. website

1990 births
Living people
People from Maidenhead
Footballers from Berkshire
English footballers
England semi-pro international footballers
Association football forwards
Swindon Town F.C. players
Weymouth F.C. players
Barnet F.C. players
Hayes & Yeading United F.C. players
Lochee United F.C. players
Dundee F.C. players
Dunfermline Athletic F.C. players
York City F.C. players
Stevenage F.C. players
Maidenhead United F.C. players
Woking F.C. players
FC Halifax Town players
Wrexham A.F.C. players
Southend United F.C. players
National League (English football) players
English Football League players
Scottish Football League players